Jeanne I may refer to:

 Jeanne I, Countess of Burgundy (1191–1205)
 Jeanne I of Navarre (1273–1305)
 Jeanne I of Auvergne (1326–1360)